The Serie B 1987–88 was the fifty-sixth tournament of this competition played in Italy since its creation.

Teams
Piacenza, Padova, Catanzaro and Barletta had been promoted from Serie C, while Brescia, Atalanta and Udinese had been relegated from Serie A.

Events
A fourth promotion spot was added from this season.

A special relegation rule was applied for the expansion of the higher league.

Final classification

Results

References and sources
Almanacco Illustrato del Calcio - La Storia 1898-2004, Panini Edizioni, Modena, September 2005
1987–88 in Italian Football at RSSSF.com

Serie B seasons
2
Italy